The Rosal Column was a republican militia column created during the Spanish Civil War. They fought in the central zone.

Bibliography 
 Octavio Ruiz Manjón-Cabeza, The Second Republic and the war.
 Víctor de la Vega Almagro, Artistic treasure and civil war: the case of Cuenca.
 Cipriano Mera, War, exile and prison of an anarcho-syndicalist. Iberian Roll, 1976.
 Eduardo de Guzmán, Red and Black Madrid. Oberon, 2004.

Defunct anarchist militant groups
Military units and formations of the Spanish Civil War
Confederal militias
Military units and formations established in 1936
Military units and formations disestablished in 1937